The Treason Act 1541 (33 Hen.8 c.20) was an Act of the Parliament of England passed in 1542 (acts of Parliament were backdated to the year in which the session of Parliament had begun, rather than the year in which the Act was actually passed). It provided for the trial and punishment of lunatics for high treason. The reason given for passing the Act was given by the Act itself, which stated "it is a thing almost impossible certainly to judge" whether a defendant's madness was real or feigned.

Provisions of the Act

Section I of the Act provided for the trial of a person who committed treason "when they were in good, whole and perfect memory, and after their accusation, examination and confession thereof before any [of] the King's majesty's council, shall happen to fall to madness or lunacy". If it appeared to at least four of the council that the defendant was sane at the time of their offence and at their "accusation, examination and confession," then a commission was to investigate the treason, swear in a jury, and try the defendant in his absence in the same manner as they would if he were sane and present. The section specifically provided that evidence would be admissible for the defence as well as for the prosecution. If convicted, the defendant would receive the same penalty as a sane defendant (death).

The same procedure applied to a peer of the realm, except that they would be tried by their peers before the Lord High Steward instead of by a jury and a normal judge.

Section II said that if the defendant had already been tried and convicted before he turned insane, then he was still to be executed in the normal manner.

The Act was retrospective and applied to treasons committed before as well as after it was passed. Its effect was reversed by the Treason Act 1554 (1&2 Ph.&M. c.10).

Other treason legislation in 1542
Another Act, 33 Hen.8 c.23, abolished peremptory challenge in trials for treason and misprision of treason. This Act was repealed by the Treason Act 1554 (1&2 Ph. & M. c.10, sec.7). The Royal Assent by Commission Act 1541 (c.21) created various new kinds of high treason (which were abolished in 1547).

References
Statutes at Large, vol. IV, Danby Pickering, Cambridge University Press, 1765.

See also
High treason in the United Kingdom
Treason Act

Treason in England
Acts of the Parliament of England (1485–1603)
1541 in law
16th century in England
1541 in England